International orange is a color used in the aerospace industry to set objects apart from their surroundings, similar to safety orange, but deeper and with a more reddish tone.

Variations of international orange

Aerospace

The Advanced Crew Escape Suits pressure suits worn by NASA astronauts and the previous Launch Entry Suit use this color, as opposed to the lighter tone of safety orange used by the United States Air Force's high-altitude suits. This was also planned for the Constellation Space Suit systems that were to be flight-ready by 2015.

The Bell X-1, the first airplane to break the sound barrier, was also painted in International Orange.

Golden Gate Bridge

The tone of international orange used to paint the Golden Gate Bridge in San Francisco, California is slightly lighter than the standard International orange used by military contractors and in engineering, thus increasing its visibility to ships, but darker than the one used in aerospace. The international orange paint used on the Golden Gate Bridge is specially formulated to protect the bridge from the danger of rust from salt spray off the ocean, and from the moisture of the San Francisco fog that frequently rolls in from the Pacific Ocean through the Golden Gate to San Francisco Bay. The 25 de Abril Bridge in Lisbon, Portugal also uses this color.

Engineering

The adjacent box displays the generic tone of international orange used by military contractors and in engineering generally.  

The source of this color is Federal Standard 595, a U.S. federal government standard set up in 1956 for paint colors which is mostly used by military contractors and also in engineering. International Orange is designated as Federal Standard 595 color #FS 12197.

In accordance with air safety regulations, some tall towers, e.g. Tokyo Tower and the Yerevan TV Tower, are painted in white and international orange.

Sports
The World Football League used international orange (instead of the traditional white) for the stripes on their footballs.  The league also painted a short international orange mark on the field at the two-yard line.

Trucking
Schneider National paints its trucks/tractors/trailers "international safety orange" (Omaha orange, PMS 165).

Apple Watch
Apple Watch Ultra features a high-contrast international orange action button.

See also 
 Fire engine red
 List of colors
 Safety orange
 School bus yellow

References

External links 
A 12-page 1988 GSA-approved specifications for International Orange paint, including other "formulas" (Archived on June 21, 2010, via the Internet Archive.)

Shades of orange
Safety
Safety clothing